The 1873 South Australian football season was the eleventh year of interclub football in South Australia. Partly due to this, Adelaide were in recess until 1875, meaning Kensington and Port Adelaide were the only teams competing in 1873.

Metropolitan football matches 

 5 July at Kensington: Kensington 1 def Port Adelaide 0 
 19 July at Kensington: Kensington 3 def Port Adelaide 0 
 23 August at Glanville Hall: Port Adelaide 1 def Kensington 0

Ladder

References 

1873 in Australian sport
Australian rules football competition seasons
South Australian football season